is a Japanese footballer who plays as a midfielder for  club Iwaki FC.

Youth career
Yamashita attended Aomori Yamada High School and made over 40 appearances for the school's team before moving to Toin University of Yokohama in 2015.
He scored on his first start for the university team, in a 2–1 JUFA Kanto League 1 victory over Keio University. He also made his first appearances in the Emperor's Cup, playing 90 minutes in both of their games and helping Toin to a narrow 4–3 defeat against J1 League club Shonan Bellmare. Yamashita played 66 times and scored 6 goals for his university between 2015 and 2018. In his third year, he was asked to represent Kanto A in the Denso Cup tournament.

Club career
In December 2018, it was announced that Yamashita would be signing for Tohoku Soccer League team Iwaki FC for the 2019 season. He made his debut for the team in May in a 3–2 Emperor's Cup defeat to Sendai University and went on to make 10 appearances in his first season with the club, helping Iwaki to gain promotion to the Japan Football League. In the 2020 season, Yamashita only made 13 appearances for the club but in the 2021 season he played in every game as Iwaki gained promotion to the J3 League. He scored his first goal for the team in a 1–1 league draw with FC Osaka. After an excellent season, Yamashita was named the league's MVP and was also inducted into the 2021 JFL Best XI.

Before the start of the 2022 season, it was announced that Yamashita would be made captain for the upcoming campaign. He made his J.League debut in a 1–1 draw with Kagoshima United and went on to play in every minute of every game throughout the season as he helped Iwaki to back-to-back promotions. For the second season running, Yamashita was inducted into the league's Best XI. In December 2022, it was announced that he had renewed his contract with the club.

Career statistics

Club
.

Honours

 Iwaki FC
Tohoku Soccer League : 2019
Japanese Regional Football Champions League : 2019
Japan Football League : 2021
J3 League : 2022

 Individual
JFL MVP: 2021
JFL Best XI: 2021
J3 League Best XI: 2022

References

External links
Profile at Iwaki FC
Profile at J.League

1996 births
Living people
Japanese footballers
Association football defenders
Association football people from Chiba Prefecture
Toin University of Yokohama alumni
Iwaki FC players
J3 League players